A Slice of Reality is a work of modern art by Richard Wilson sitting by (and commissioned for) the Millennium Dome on the north-western bank of the Greenwich Peninsula. It consists of a  sliced vertical section through the former 800-ton  sand dredger Arco Trent and exposes portions of the former living quarters of the vessel to the elements (such as a visible pool table in the lower decks).

The work is one of the sculptures on The Line art trail in East London. It was originally commissioned for the millennium "North Meadow Sculpture Project".

Gallery

These photographs were taken during Open House London 2015.

References

Public art in London
Buildings and structures celebrating the third millennium
2000 sculptures
Outdoor sculptures in London
Ships in art